Lucky Lips is a song written by Jerry Leiber and Mike Stoller.  It was originally recorded by Ruth Brown in 1956 and was successfully covered by Cliff Richard in 1963.

Ruth Brown and early cover versions
The song was first recorded by the R&B singer Ruth Brown for Atlantic Records in New York in September 1956, and was released as a single in early 1957. It was her second hit on the US pop chart, after "(Mama) He Treats Your Daughter Mean" in 1953, reaching number 25 on the pop chart and number 6 on the Billboard R&B chart.

The song was covered by the white singer Gale Storm, as the B-side of her single "On Treasure Island", for Dot Records. Storm's recording reached number 77 on the Billboard pop chart. The song was also covered by Dottie Evans for Bell Records. In Britain, it was recorded by Alma Cogan as the B-side of "Whatever Lola Wants", which reached number 26 on the UK singles chart, also in 1957.

Cliff Richard version

In 1963 the song was recorded by Cliff Richard, whose version went to number 4 in the UK. It was more successful internationally, reaching number 1 in Belgium, Denmark, Hong Kong, India, Israel, Netherlands, Norway, South Africa and Sweden. His version with German lyrics reached number 1 in West Germany, Austria and Switzerland. Richard was presented with a Gold disc by EMI Records for one million worldwide sales of "Lucky Lips".

Richard's German version, titled "Rote Lippen soll man küssen" ("Red Lips Should Be Kissed"), with lyrics by Hans Bradtke, stayed at number 1 in West Germany for seven weeks and had sold half a million by the end of 1963. The English version also charted in West Germany in its own right before the German version was released in September.

Chart performance
"Lucky Lips" (English version)

"Rote Lippen soll man küssen" (German version)

Other cover versions
With lyrics in Swedish by Christer Jonasson as "Slit och släng", Siw Malmkvist scored a 9 week long Svensktoppen hit with the song from November 5, 1966 – January 14, 1967, peaking at #2. These lyrics reflects the society of Swedish in the 1950s and 60s. Siw Malmkvist also made a version in Danish, "Slid og slæb".

In 1969, a Catalan version, "Llavis de mel" (Honey lips), was included in "Tots Som Pops", the first LP recorded by the Catalan group La Trinca. The lyrics were translated and adapted by the writer Jaume Picas (1921–1976).

Estonian singer Ivo Linna and his band Rock Hotell recorded an Estonian language version titled Kikilips (Bowtie) about the article of clothing in 1980. His version has become a very well-known song in Estonia.

In 2003, Florian Ast released a Bernese German version titled "Schöni Meitschi" (Beautiful Girls). The song reached #7 in Schweizer Hitparade.

References

Songs about luck
1957 singles
1963 singles
Cliff Richard songs
Number-one singles in Belgium
Number-one singles in Germany
Irish Singles Chart number-one singles
Dutch Top 40 number-one singles
Number-one singles in Sweden
Number-one singles in Switzerland
Number-one singles in Denmark
Number-one singles in Norway
Songs written by Jerry Leiber and Mike Stoller
Columbia Graphophone Company singles
Atlantic Records singles
1957 songs
Ruth Brown songs
Song recordings produced by Norrie Paramor